Hematoporphyrin (Photodyn, Sensibion) is a porphyrin prepared from hemin.  It is a derivative of protoporphyrin IX, where the two vinyl groups have been hydrated (converted to alcohols). It is a deeply colored solid that is usually encountered as a solution.  Its chemical structure was determined in 1900.

It is used as a photosensitizer in photodynamic therapy.  Acetylation of hematoporphyrin followed by hydrolysis of the product of that reaction affords a mixture called hematoporphyrin derivative (HPD), which is also used in photodynamic therapy.

Hematoporphyrin has also been used as an antidepressant and antipsychotic since the 1920s.

References 

Antidepressants
Antipsychotics
Hematology
Tetrapyrroles